Leigh Rogers (born 1 August 1989, in London) is an English ice dancer. With former partner Lloyd Jones, she is the 2006 & 2007 British junior national champion and competed twice at the World Junior Figure Skating Championships.

Competitive highlights 
(with Jones)

Programs 
(with Jones)

References

External links 
 

Living people
1989 births
Sportspeople from London
English female ice dancers